Narayanhat Union is a union of Bhujpur Thana of Chittagong District.

Geography
Area of Narayanhat : 14,800 acres (59.9 km2.)।

Location
North: Dantmara Union
East:  Manikchhari Upazila
South: Bhujpur Union
West:  Sitakunda Mountain Range and Mirsarai Upzillah

Population
At the 1991 Bangladesh census, Narayanhat Union had a population of 23,370.

Education
 Narayanhat Degree College.
 Narayanhat (Collegiate) High School.
 Narayanhat Senior Madrasha.
 Narayanhat (Chanpur) High School.
 Shatchora Govt Primary School.
 Narayanhat Govt. Primary School.
 Jujkhola Govt. Primary School.
 Mirzarhat High School.
 Mirzarhat Govt. Primary school.
 Mohanagor Reg. Primary School
 Sahtchora Hedaytul Islam Madrasha

Marketplaces and bazaars
Narayanhat and Mirzarhat is the main marketplace in the union. Shatchora bazar

Villages and mouzas
Chanpur, Dhamarkhil, Shouilkopa, 
s jujkhola,N Jujkhola, Hapania, Sundarpur. West Chandpur Shatchora.

References

Unions of Bhujpur Thana